Campagnola Emilia is a comune (municipality) in the Province of Reggio Emilia in the Italian region Emilia-Romagna, located about  northwest of Bologna and about  northeast of Reggio Emilia. 

Campagnola Emilia borders the following municipalities: Correggio, Fabbrico, Novellara, Reggiolo, Rio Saliceto.

References

Cities and towns in Emilia-Romagna